The 1975–76 Guinness National Basketball League season was the fourth season of the English National Basketball League.

The league was sponsored by Guinness and the number of teams participating remained at ten. One new team appeared in the form of the Leeds Larsen Lions club, but Exeter St Lukes dropped down to the second division. The Crystal Palace team, sponsored by Cinzano and devoid of the Sutton merger, completed the double of National League and Cup. There were no playoffs  during this era and American Jim Guymon of Crystal Palace won the George Williams Trophy for Most Valuable Player.

National League

First Division

Second Division

National Cup Final

Leading scorers

References

See also
Basketball in England
British Basketball League
English Basketball League
List of English National Basketball League seasons

National Basketball League (England) seasons
 
British